Jamal Vidadi oglu Ismayilov (born 1984) was an Azerbaijani chief warrant officer in the Special Forces of Azerbaijan. Ismayilov received the title of the Hero of the Patriotic War following his achievements in the Aras Valley campaign and Battle of Hadrut in the 2020 Nagorno-Karabakh war.

References 

1984 births
People from Neftchala District
Heroes of the Patriotic War
Living people